The Price of Family is a 2022 Italian comedy film directed by Giovanni Bognetti.

The film is a remake of the 2021 French film Price of Parenting, directed by Alexandra Leclère.

Cast
Christian De Sica as Carlo
Angela Finocchiaro as Anna
Dharma Mangia Woods as Alessandra
Claudio Colica as Emilio
Fioretta Mari as Giuliana
Alessandro Betti as Azeglio
Francesco Marioni as Rocco
Iaia Forte as Loredana

References

External links

2022 films
2020s Italian-language films
2022 comedy films
2020s Christmas comedy films
Italian Christmas comedy films
Italian-language Netflix original films
Italian remakes of French films
2020s Italian films